Dyane Connor (born June 1979) is an Irish journalist who currently works as a reporter with RTÉ News.

Born in Killeagh, County Cork, Dyane was educated at St. Aloysius' College in Carrigtwohill. She completed a Bachelor of Arts in University College Cork, before graduating with an MA in journalism from Dublin City University in 2001.

Dyane began her broadcasting career with Cork Campus Radio during her studies at University College Cork. Her first position after graduating was as a reporter and newsreader with CKR FM. Dyane joined Newstalk in 2002, before moving to TV3 in 2004. Initially working as a news anchor and general reporter, she was the TV3 courts correspondent for three years. During her tenure with TV3, Dyane also presented the 24 Hours to Kill crime series.

In 2013 Dyane joined RTÉ News as a multi-media journalist on RTÉ television and radio.

References

1979 births
Living people
RTÉ newsreaders and journalists